Manuela Angeli (born 3 April 1939) is an Italian former competitive figure skater. She represented Italy at the 1956 Winter Olympics in Cortina d'Ampezzo.

Competitive highlights

References 

1939 births
Figure skaters at the 1956 Winter Olympics
Italian female single skaters
Living people
Olympic figure skaters of Italy
People from Cortina d'Ampezzo
Sportspeople from the Province of Belluno